The 2003 Polish Speedway season was the 2003 season of motorcycle speedway in Poland.

Individual

Polish Individual Speedway Championship
The 2003 Individual Speedway Polish Championship final was held on 15 August at Bydgoszcz.

Golden Helmet
The 2003 Golden Golden Helmet organised by the Polish Motor Union (PZM) was the 2003 event for the league's leading riders. The final was held on the 18 October at Wrocław.

Junior Championship
 winner - Łukasz Romanek

Silver Helmet
 winner - Robert Miśkowiak

Bronze Helmet
 winner - Janusz Kołodziej

Pairs

Polish Pairs Speedway Championship
The 2003 Polish Pairs Speedway Championship was the 2003 edition of the Polish Pairs Speedway Championship. The final was held on 1 August at Leszno.

Team

Team Speedway Polish Championship
The 2003 Team Speedway Polish Championship was the 2003 edition of the Team Polish Championship. Włókniarz Częstochowa won the gold medal.

Ekstraliga

1.Liga

2.Liga

Promotion/relegation play offs
Tarnów - Gdańsk 48–42, 48-42
Ostrów - Rawicz 51–38, 48-42

References

Poland Individual
Poland Team
Speedway
2003 in Polish speedway